Lycée Gustave Flaubert may refer:

Schools in France:
 Lycée Gustave Flaubert (Rouen)

Schools outside of France:
 Lycée Gustave Flaubert (Rabat) - Morocco
 Lycée Gustave Flaubert (La Marsa) - Tunisia